Poor me may refer to:

 "Poor Me", a 1960 song by Adam Faith
 "Poor Me", a 2017 song by Shania Twain from Now

See also
 Victim mentality
 Victim playing